Émile Lisbonne (20 June 1876 – 21 December 1947) was a French lawyer and Radical politician. He was briefly Minister of Health in 1933, and again for a few days in 1934.

Early years

Émile Lisbonne was born on 20 June 1876 in Nyons, Drôme.
He was a relative of Eugène Lisbonne, an attorney and senator for Hérault who was Senate rapporteur for the 1881 law on freedom of the press.
His father was Jules Lisbonne, an attorney in Nyons, municipal councilor and deputy mayor.
Émile Lisbonne attended the lycée in Avignon, then studied at the Faculty of Law in Aix-en-Provence and the Faculty of Law in Paris.

Lisbonne's father died in 1900 and he had to support his mother and two sisters.
He became a prosecutor, and served in various different courts in France.
He enlisted in the army at the start of World War I (1914–18) and served with bravery.
As a magistrate he was sometimes called to sit on military tribunals, and was shocked by some of the expedient judgments. 
As a senator he would be rapporteur of a bill to establish a special court of military justice.

National politics

Lisbonne ran in the by-election on 6 January 1924 that followed the death of the senator for the Drôme, and was elected in the second round of voting.
He sat with the Democratic and Radical Left and Radical Socialist group.
After his election he was named honorary vice-president of the tribunal of the Seine.
He was reelected in the first round on 20 October 1929.
He was chosen  Minister of Health in the first ministry of Albert Sarraut on 27 October 1933.
The ministry fell on 24 November 1933.
Lisbonne was Minister of Health in the cabinet of Édouard Daladier that took office on 30 January 1934. 
It was replaced after a few days by the Doumerge cabinet of 9 February 1934.

Lisbonne was one of the few left-wing Radicals in the senate.
Later he left the Radical party and joined the socialists.
He was one of the few senators who gave their support to the Popular Front in 1936.
He was defeated in the elections of 23 October 1938.

Later career

Lisbonne continued to serve in the general council of the Drôme as representative for Buis-les-Baronnies.
During World War II (1939–45) the Vichy regime dissolved the general councils.
Lisbonne, who was closely associated with the left, was placed under house arrest in Aveyron.
He returned to the Drôme after the Liberation of France.
In 1947 he was named a member of the Superior Council of the Magistracy.
Lisbonne died in Paris on 21 December 1947 at the age of 71.

Publications

Notes

Sources

1876 births
1947 deaths
French Senators of the Third Republic
French Ministers of Health
20th-century French lawyers
Senators of Drôme